Sonya Esmée Florence Butt  (14 May 1924 – 21 December 2014), also known as Sonia d'Artois, code named Blanche, was an agent of the clandestine Special Operations Executive during the Second World War. SOE agents allied themselves with groups resisting the occupation of their countries by Axis powers. The purpose of SOE was to conduct espionage, sabotage, and reconnaissance in occupied countries. The SOE supplied resistance groups with weapons and equipment parachuted in from England. 

Butt worked as a courier for the Headmaster network of SOE. She was the youngest agent of either sex sent by the SOE to work in France.

Early life 

Sonya Butt was born in Kent on 14 May 1924. When war broke out in 1939, she was 15 years old, though by then the family had moved to Woking.

Service in the Women's Auxiliary Air Force 

Butt was only a schoolgirl at the start of the war, and would not be due to join up for at least a couple of years. Her preference was for the Women's Auxiliary Air Force (WAAF), as her father had served in the RAF himself, but the minimum age join the WAAF was 17½. Butt joined up the very day she became eligible: 14 November 1941, becoming 454240 Aircraftwoman (ACW) Butt. She served in the Administrative Branch.
 
In 1941, women were banned from front-line service. In April 1942, however, this provision was changed and one of the first organisations to take advantage of this was the Special Operations Executive (SOE). SOE trained teams to operate 'behind the lines' in countries under Nazi occupation. The role of courier was particularly important, as movements around a district were likely to encounter German check-points, and a male of military or working age attracted adverse attention; a woman on a bicycle, however, was less likely to be suspected, and if she attracted attention at all, it was usually the sort that makes a besotted sentry forget to check papers and luggage properly. SOE began to look for potential female couriers, but the work was highly dangerous and required toughness mind and body to perform under such pressure, so SOE had to be very demanding, very selective and very secretive. It did not advertise its vacancies and recruited by 'the usual methods': word of mouth, and other quiet and roundabout means; a skill in the appropriate language was a good starting point. 

Whilst working at RAF Gosforth (alongside another future SOE agent, Patricia O'Sullivan), Butt had been advertising her fluency in French in an attempt to get attached to the Free French squadrons and escape her dreary routine. She failed in this bid, but this did bring her to the attention of SOE, and she was soon accepted for training.  She was given an honorary commission as an Assistant Section Officer.

Special Operations Executive 

Butt joined SOE, aged 19, on 11 December 1943. Her training followed the usual programme of tough outdoor training to develop stamina and basic soldiering skills, followed by specialist training according to the operation requirements, plus familiarisation with the routine of life in occupied Europe. Recruits could not discuss their training with outsiders, and in any case, this sort of training was unheard of for women, so at the time few would understand or even believe the full details of the armed and unarmed combat training they received. Only fellow students could give meaningful support. Sonya's colleagues in the SOE included Nancy Wake and Violette Szabo, as well as the French-Canadian army officer Captain Guy D'Artois, whom she would later marry.

On 28 May 1944, Butt was parachuted into the department of the Sarthe in the area of Le Mans to work as a courier, under the codename "Blanche", for Christopher Hudson (codename Albin), the organizer of the Reseau (Circuit) Headmaster. She was one of the last WAAFs landed in France before the Allied invasion, only nine days before D-Day.  After one of the other agents dropped with her was shot during a battle between the Maquis and the Germans, Sonya took on the additional role of weapons instructor.  She later said, "I filled in wherever the need arose."  As a courier, her primary responsibilities were to carry money, pass messages and maintain contact with the SOE agents, Maquis and local operatives working with the circuit.  

In June 1944, whilst delivering messages around the countryside, she was stopped by two Germans and detained for questioning. This was a very dangerous moment, but her cover story and false papers withstood the examination, and she was eventually released. 

In due course, the Allied ground forces broke out from Normandy and Sonya's district was liberated. In October 1944, she returned to England on the successful completion of her mission.

Honours and awards

Her work and bravery were recognised with the award of the MBE and a Mention in Dispatches. She was still only 20 years old.

Postwar life
Much to the annoyance of her superiors, Butt left without signing off.  After the war, Sonya and Guy went to live in Canada. Guy d'Artois had parachuted into another district of France about the same time as Butt. For the success of his mission, he was awarded the Distinguished Service Order and the Croix de Guerre. In 1947, he received another very senior decoration, the George Medal (GM) for his work in rescuing an injured missionary in northern Canada. After a tour in Japan, Guy served in the Korean War, before the couple settled down again in Canada. Guy and Sonia (an alternative spelling of her name) had six children, three boys and three girls. In Canada, she also used the name Toni D'Artois.

Butt's husband died at the Sainte-Anne-de-Bellevue Veterans hospital in March 1999. Sonya Butt died on 21 December 2014 at the age of 90. She was survived by the couple's six children. She was described, incorrectly, in her obituary of being the last surviving female British spy of the Second World War.

See also 
 Lilian Rolfe

Notes

References
 Squadron Leader Beryl E. Escott, Mission Improbable: A salute to the RAF women of SOE in wartime France, London, Patrick Stevens Limited, 1991.  
 Marcus Binney, The Women Who Lived for Danger: the Women Agents of SOE in the Second World War, London, Hodder and Stoughton, 2002.  
 Liane Jones, A Quiet Courage: Women Agents in the French Resistance, London, Transworld Publishers Ltd, 1990.

External links
Sonya Butt's entry on the 64 Baker Street site
 Details of Guy D'Artois on the Canada Veterans Hall of Valour Official Site

British Special Operations Executive personnel
Women's Auxiliary Air Force officers
Members of the Order of the British Empire
English emigrants to Canada
1924 births
2014 deaths